Emre Can Atila (born 2 September 1996) is a Turkish professional footballer who plays as a midfielder for Ergene Velimeşe.

Club career

Konyaspor
On 12 May 2017, Emre Can Atila made his debut in a 2–1 away defeat against Kayserispor after coming on as a substitute at 82nd minute in place of Marc Kibong Mbamba.

Loan at Konya Anadolu Selçukspor
On 26 August 2017, Emre Can Atila made his debut in a 3–1 home win against Pendikspor after being named in the starting line-up.

Loan at Shkupi
On 10 February 2018, Emre Can Atila joined Macedonian First Football League side Shkupi, on a season-long loan. On 4 March 2018, he made his debut in a 1–1 home draw against Rabotnički after being named in the starting line-up.

Career statistics

Club

References

External links

Emre Can Atila at Konyaspor

1996 births
People from Yenimahalle
Living people
Turkish footballers
Association football midfielders
Gençlerbirliği S.K. footballers
1922 Konyaspor footballers
Konyaspor footballers
FK Shkupi players
Kırklarelispor footballers
Ankaraspor footballers
Süper Lig players
TFF First League players
TFF Second League players
Macedonian First Football League players
Turkish expatriate footballers
Turkish expatriate sportspeople in North Macedonia
Expatriate footballers in North Macedonia